Montbel is a commune in the Lozère département in southern France.

See also
Communes of the Lozère department

References

Communes of Lozère